Dream a Dream is the third album by Welsh soprano Charlotte Church, released in 2000. The album is principally a collection of Christmas carols but also includes the non-Christmas title track "Dream a Dream", Church's first foray into a more pop-influenced genre, composed by James Shearman and Simon Greenaway based on the melody from Fauré's "Pavane" with lyrics by Sam Babenia.

Dream a Dream was also the biggest-selling holiday album of 2000 in the United States with sales of 1,077,000 according to Nielsen/SoundScan.
On 6 December 2000, Dream a Dream was certified platinum by the Recording Industry Association of America for shipments of one million copies in the U.S.
By 5 December 2008, the album had accumulated total sales of 1,630,000 copies in the U.S. according to SoundScan.

Track listing

United Kingdom track listing
The version released in the United Kingdom.
"Dream a Dream" (with Billy Gilman)
"O Come, All Ye Faithful"
"Little Drummer Boy"
"The First Noel"
"Mary's Boy Child"
"Ding Dong Merrily on High"
"Winter Wonderland"
"The Christmas Song"
"Hark! The Herald Angels Sing"
"The Coventry Carol (Lully Lullay)"
"Joy to the World"
"When a Child Is Born"
"What Child Is This?"
"God Rest Ye Merry, Gentlemen"
"Draw Tua Bethlehem"
"Ave Maria"
"Gabriel's Message"
"O Holy Night"
"Lo How A Rose E'er Blooming"
"Silent Night"

United States track listing
The version released in the United States. (Excluding "4. The First Noel" from the UK version.)
"Dream a Dream" – 3:54 (with Billy Gilman)
"O Come, All Ye Faithful" – 3:21
"Little Drummer Boy" – 2:57
"Mary's Boy Child" – 3:31
"Ding Dong Merrily on High" – 2:18
"Winter Wonderland" – 3:03
"The Christmas Song" – 3:29
"Hark! The Herald Angels Sing" – 3:17
"The Coventry Carol (Lully Lullay)" – 2:32
"Joy to the World" – 2:12
"When a Child Is Born" – 2:29
"What Child Is This?" – 2:46
"God Rest Ye Merry, Gentlemen" – 2:00
"Draw Tua Bethlehem" – 3:37
"Ave Maria" – 2:50
"Gabriel's Message" – 2:43
"O Holy Night" – 4:22
"Lo! How a Rose E'er Blooming" – 2:32
"Silent Night" – 3:47

Target Exclusive Special Edition track listing
The version exclusively available in Target discount stores.
"Dream a Dream" (with Billy Gilman)
"O Come, All Ye Faithful"
"Little Drummer Boy"
"The First Noel"
"Mary's Boy Child"
"Ding Dong Merrily on High"
"Winter Wonderland"
"The Christmas Song"
"Hark! The Herald Angels Sing"
"The Coventry Carol (Lully Lullay)"
"Joy to the World"
"When a Child Is Born"
"What Child Is This?"
"God Rest Ye Merry, Gentlemen"
"Draw Tua Bethlehem"
"Ave Maria"
"Gabriel's Message"
"O Tannenbaum"
"O Holy Night"
"Lo How A Rose E'er Blooming"
"Silent Night"

Charts

Weekly charts

Year-end charts

Certifications

Release history

See also
 List of Billboard Top Holiday Albums number ones of the 2000s

References

Amazon.co.uk: Charlotte Church – Dream a Dream: Music
Amazon.com: Dream a Dream: Music

2000 Christmas albums
Charlotte Church albums
Christmas albums by Welsh artists
Classical crossover albums
Sony Classical Records albums
Pop Christmas albums
Classical Christmas albums